The Premio Faenza is an international prize for contemporary ceramic art. It is awarded by the Museo Internazionale delle Ceramiche in Faenza, in Emilia-Romagna in northern Italy, and is the principal Italian prize of its kind.

History 

The prize was established in 1931. In 1938 it became an annual national award and was named "Premio Faenza". The award was not made in some years of the Second World War, and recommenced in 1946. In 1963 it became international in scope – although several foreign artists had already been invited to participate in earlier editions – and from 1989 it became a biennial award.

Recipients 

References

Awards established in 1938
Ceramic art awards
Arts awards in Italy